Pauline is a fossil genus of ostracods from the Silurian. Genus contains two species: Pauline avibella found in 425-million-year-old rocks in the Herefordshire Lagerstätte in England near the Welsh Border and Pauline nivisis, known from the Lower Silurian (upper Telychian) Pentamerus Bjerge Formation of north Greenland.

References

Myodocopida
Prehistoric ostracod genera
Silurian crustaceans
Fossils of Greenland